Baliros is a commune in the Pyrénées-Atlantiques department in the Nouvelle-Aquitaine region of south-western France.

The inhabitants of the commune are known as Balirosiens or Balirosiennes.

Geography
Baliros is located some 12 km south-east of Pau just west of Bordes. Access to the commune is by the D37 road from Narcastet in the north which passes through the centre of the commune and the village before continuing south to Pardies-Piétat. The village is served by bus routes 809, 810, and 811 of the Interurban Network of Pyrenees-Atlantiques which connect Pau with Arthez-d'Asson. The commune is forested west of the village with the eastern side farmland.

The Gave de Pau flows north along the eastern border of the commune although it is not the communal border. The Luz river flows from the south-west of the commune north through the village to join the Gave de Pau at the northern border of the commune. The Gest joins the Luz in the south of the commune. The Escourre flows north from the south-eastern corner of the commune to join the Luz north of the village.

Places and hamlets
 L'Arroundade de la Plaine
 Cazaous
 Claverie
 Colomby (château)
 L'Engoust
 Hillou (part)
 Hourcade
 Monregard

Neighbouring communes and villages

Toponymy
Michel Grosclaude proposed the Latin etymology of the surname Valerus with the Aquitaine suffix -ossum giving "Domain of Valerus".

The following table details the origins of the commune name.

Sources:
Grosclaude: Toponymic Dictionary of communes, Béarn, 2006 
Raymond: Topographic Dictionary of the Department of Basses-Pyrenees, 1863, on the page numbers indicated in the table. 
Cassini: Cassini Map from 1750

Origins:
Census: Census of Béarn
Assat: Titles of Assat
Reformation: Reformation of Béarn

History
Paul Raymond noted on page 20 of his 1863 dictionary that in 1385 Baliros had 11 fires and depended on the bailiwick of Pau.

Heraldry

Administration

List of Successive Mayors

Inter-communality
The commune is part of six inter-communal structures:
 the Communauté de communes du Pays de Nay;
 the SIVU of RPI Baliros - Pardies-Piétat - Saint-Abit (headquarters in Baliros);
 the drinking water and sanitation association of Pays de Nay (SEAPAN);
 the Energy association of Pyrénées-Atlantiques;
 the inter-communal association for defence against floods of the Gave de Pau;
 the inter-communal association for defence against floods of the Luz;

Demography
In 2017 the commune had 475 inhabitants.

Economy
The commune is part of the Appellation d'origine contrôlée (AOC) zone of Ossau-iraty.

Sites and monuments
The Parish Church of Saint Peter (1658) is registered as an historical monument.

Facilities

Baliros is a member of the Inter-communal Educational Grouping (RPI) of Baliros - Pardies-Piétat - Saint-Abit which runs the Baliros and Pardies-Piétat primary schools.

See also
Communes of the Pyrénées-Atlantiques department

References

External links

Baliros on the 1750 Cassini Map

Communes of Pyrénées-Atlantiques